Two Worlds One Heart is an album by the South African choral group Ladysmith Black Mambazo, released in 1990. The first single was "Township Jive", which the group had performed on the Graceland tour.

The album peaked at No. 2 on Billboard'''s World Albums chart. The group supported the album with a North American tour.

Production
Several songs contain instrumental backing, a first for a Ladysmith album. Ray Phiri wrote two of the album's songs. Marvin Winans produced "Leaning on the Everlasting Arm", on which the Winans sang; group leader Joseph Shabalala was inspired to record the song after hearing Sweet Honey in the Rock. George Clinton cowrote and produced "Scatter the Fire". Anton Fig played drums on the album.

Critical reception

Robert Christgau wrote that Shabalala "has the lineaments of a pop visionary, and here he arrives at a crossover that does the style proud, moving gracefully from Zulu to English within and between songs and pumping the a cappella rhythms with instruments on three cuts." The Austin American-Statesman concluded that "the most intriguing musical meeting of minds ... is undoubtedly 'Scatter the Fire', a song that melds Zulu dance and American mutant funk."

The Calgary Herald deemed the album "another haunting collection of spirituals, ballads, and Zulu traditionals." The Los Angeles Times determined that "much of LBM's music is based on hypnotic, not-quite-mainstream-sounding harmonies sung by voices so beautiful as to be not quite of this world ... No one is making music more heartfelt than this." The Houston Chronicle'' praised the "dreamlike, a cappella harmonies and uplifting messages of faith and hope."

AllMusic wrote that "this is one of the most ambitious albums Ladysmith has ever done, and its risk-taking pays off handsomely."

Track listing

References

Ladysmith Black Mambazo albums
1990 albums
Warner Records albums